Birmingham Country Club, located in Birmingham, Michigan, was founded in 1916 as Birmingham Golf Club. The golf course at the club hosted the PGA Championship in 1953, which Walter Burkemo won, as well as the 1968 United States Women's Amateur Golf Championship.

References

External links
 Birmingham Country Club website

Golf clubs and courses in Michigan
Sports venues in Oakland County, Michigan
1916 establishments in Michigan